The men's 110 metres hurdles was a track and field athletics event held as part of the Athletics at the 1904 Summer Olympics programme. It was the third time the event was held. 6 hurdlers from 2 nations participated. The competition was held on September 3, 1904. The event was won by Fred Schule of the United States, the third of five consecutive victories for the nation in the first five Olympic Games. It was also the second of four consecutive podium sweeps for the Americans in the event.

Background

This was the third appearance of the event, which is one of 12 athletics events to have been held at every Summer Olympics. None of the hurdlers from 1900 returned. Edwin Clapp was the 1903 and 1904 IC4A champion and the American favorite; he entered but did not start. Thaddeus Shideler had matched Alvin Kraenzlein's 120 yards hurdles world record. Fred Schule was the 1903 AAU champion, while Frank Castleman was the 1904 winner.

Australia made its first appearance in the event. The United States made its third appearance, the only nation to compete in the 110 metres hurdles in each of the first three Games.

Competition format

There were two rounds: semifinals and a final. There were two semifinals, one with 2 runners and one with 4 runners after withdrawals. The top two runners in each of the semifinal heats advanced to the 4-man final.

Records

These were the standing world and Olympic records (in seconds) prior to the 1904 Summer Olympics.

(*) unofficial 120 yards (= 109.73 m)

Schedule

Results

Semifinals

The top two finishers in each semifinal heat advanced to the final.

Semifinal 1

Semifinal 2

McPherson withdrew after learning that the hurdles were one foot lower than normal.

Final

Results summary

References

Sources
 

Athletics at the 1904 Summer Olympics
Sprint hurdles at the Olympics